Abraxas martaria is a species of moth belonging to the family Geometridae. It was described by Achille Guenée in 1857. It is known from northern India.

References

Abraxini
Moths of Asia
Moths described in 1857